Henry O'Brien, 7th Earl of Thomond PC (Ire) (c. 16202 May 1691) was an Irish peer, styled Lord Ibrackan from 1639 to 1657.

O'Brien was the son of Barnabas O'Brien, 6th Earl of Thomond and Anne Fermor. In 1641, he married his first cousin Anne O'Brien (d. September 1645), daughter of Henry O'Brien, 5th Earl of Thomond, by whom he had one son:
Henry, Lord Ibrackan (c. 1642 – 1678)

After Anne's death, he married Sarah Russell, daughter of Sir Francis Russell, and widow of Sir John Reynolds. This made O'Brian a brother-in-law of Henry Cromwell, who had married Sarah's sister Elizabeth. O'Brian and Sarah had five children:
Henry, died in infancy
Henry Horatio, Lord Ibrackan (d. 1690), who was father of Henry O'Brien, 8th Earl of Thomond (1688–1741)
Elizabeth (d. 3 June 1688), without issue
Auberie Anne Penelope, married Henry Howard, 6th Earl of Suffolk, and had issue
Mary, married Sir Matthew Dudley, 2nd Baronet

References

1691 deaths
Members of the Privy Council of Ireland
Henry
17th-century Irish people
People from County Clare
Year of birth uncertain
1620s births
Earls of Thomond
Irish chiefs of the name